is a passenger railway station in located in the city of Higashiōsaka,  Osaka Prefecture, Japan, operated by the private railway operator Kintetsu Railway.  It is adjacent to, but not connected with, the JR West JR-Shuntokumichi Station.

Lines
Shuntokumichi Station is served by the Osaka Line, and is located 5.1 rail kilometers from the starting point of the line at Ōsaka Uehommachi Station.

Station layout
The station consists of two elevated side platforms, with the station building underneath

Platforms

Adjacent stations

History
Shuntokumichi Station opened on December 30, 1926.

Passenger statistics
In fiscal 2018, the station was used by an average of 6,699 passengers daily.

Surrounding area
JR-Shuntokumichi Station
Higashi Osaka Municipal Fuse Junior High School
Higashi Osaka Municipal Arakawa Elementary School
Higashi Osaka City Sannose Elementary School
Higashi Osaka City Taiheiji Elementary School

See also
List of railway stations in Japan

References

External links

 Shuntokumichi Station 

Railway stations in Osaka Prefecture
Railway stations in Japan opened in 1926
 Higashiōsaka